Cyana is a genus of moths in the subfamily Arctiinae.

Cyana may also refer to:

 CYANA (software), a combined assignment and dynamics algorithm for NMR applications
 Another name for the ancient Greek diver Hydna of Scione